Rural Bank may refer to:

 Regional Rural Bank, a type of bank in India
 Bankwest, originally the Rural & Industries Bank of Western Australia
 Rural Bank Limited, a subsidiary of the Bendigo and Adelaide Bank
 State Bank of New South Wales, originally Rural Bank of New South Wales
 The Rural Bank Limited, a former New Zealand Government owned bank later acquired by the National Bank of New Zealand

See also
 Rural Credit Cooperatives
 List of regional rural banks in Uttar Pradesh